CJHS may refer to:

 Caledonia Junior High School
 Chicagoland Jewish High School, now Rochelle Zell Jewish High School
 Cornwallis Junior High School
 Carl Junction High School